Lars Jonson Haukaness (February 28, 1862 – September 4, 1929) was a Norwegian born American-Canadian impressionist painter  and art instructor who was known for his landscapes.

Early life and education
Haukaness was from the village of Folkedal, in Granvin municipality in the county of Hordaland, Norway.  He was the third of four sons of John Sjursen and Elisabet Haaversdatter on the Haukenæs farm in the Ulvik parish. In 1882, Haukaness received a grant from the government of Norway,  and from 1882 until 1885 he studied at the Royal Academy of Art (now the Norwegian National Academy of Craft and Art Industry) with Knud Bergslien  in Oslo.

Career
In 1888, Haukaness immigrated to the United States, locating in Chicago, Illinois. Haukaness was a designer and painter for the World's Columbian Exposition between 1892 and 1893. Works by Haukaness were exhibited at the Art Institute of Chicago in 1901 and 1902. Between 1902 and 1909, he lived in Madison and La Crosse, Wisconsin, and Spring Grove, Minnesota, where he worked as a portrait and landscape painter.  From 1909 until 1913, he returned to Norway. Upon returning to the United States, Haukaness conducted exhibits in Chicago, Madison and Minneapolis. He also worked as a cartoonist.

In 1921, Haukaness moved to Manitoba, where he taught art in Winnipeg. In 1923, he was awarded a prize at the Chicago-Norwegian Exhibition. Works by Haukaness were exhibited at the Minnesota State Fair in 1925.

In 1926, Haukaness moved to Calgary, where he taught at the Provincial Institute of Technology and Art (now Alberta College of Art and Design) and introduced his students to modern art and impressionism. His students included Canadian artist Maxwell Bates.  He painted frequently in the Ptarmigan Valley.

Death and legacy
Haukaness died in 1929, while head of the art department at the institute. He died of heart disease while camping in the Ptarmigan Valley in the Canadian Rockies, falling from his horse while trying to reach the resort at Lake Louise. He was buried in Banff, Alberta.

Art by Haukaness has been shown at exhibitions  sponsored by St. Olaf College and the University of Minnesota. Works by Haukaness are presently featured in several art museums, including the Minneapolis Institute of Art and in the University of Alberta Art Collection.

References

Other sources
 
 
 
Haugan, Reidar Rye. Prominent Artists and Exhibits of Their Work in Chicago (Chicago: Nordmanns-Forbundet, 24: 371—374, Volume 7, 1933)

External links
 University of Alberta Art Collection
 Alberta Society of Artists

1862 births
1929 deaths
American Impressionist painters
Canadian Impressionist painters
Norwegian Impressionist painters
19th-century Canadian painters
Canadian male painters
20th-century Canadian painters
19th-century American painters
American male painters
20th-century American painters
Canadian people of Norwegian descent
Norwegian emigrants to the United States
American emigrants to Canada
People from Granvin
Artists from Chicago
Artists from Madison, Wisconsin
People from Spring Grove, Minnesota
Artists from Winnipeg
19th-century American male artists
20th-century American male artists
19th-century Canadian male artists
20th-century Canadian male artists